Dante Swanson (born January 23, 1981) is an American former professional basketball player.

He played college basketball for Tulsa from 1999 till 2003. With Tulsa, he was a NIT champion in 2001. In 2001 and 2002, he was named to the WAC All-Defensive Team.

In 2003, Swanson started his professional career. In 2007, he signed with AZS Koszalin, where he would stay three straight seasons. In 2009, he won the Polish Basketball Cup with Koszalin, and was named the competition's Most Valuable Player. In 2018 Swanson was elected to the Wagoner High School Athletics Hall of Fame.

Honours

College
National Invitation Tournament: 2001
Individual
All-WAC Second Team: 2002
WAC All-Defensive Team (2): 2001, 2002

Professional
Polish Cup: 2010
Individual
Polish Cup MVP: 2010

Coaching career 
Swanson was named the head coach of his alma mater Wagoner High School in March of 2021.  He went 12-13 in his first season leading the Bulldogs.

References

1989 births
Living people
American expatriate basketball people in Poland
American expatriate basketball people in Turkey
American expatriate basketball people in Ukraine
American men's basketball players
Astoria Bydgoszcz players
AZS Koszalin players
Basketball players from Oklahoma
BC Cherkaski Mavpy players
BC Hoverla players
Best Balıkesir B.K. players
KK Włocławek players
Point guards
Śląsk Wrocław basketball players
Tulsa Golden Hurricane men's basketball players